"Brand New" is a song by American singer Ben Rector on his sixth studio album of the same name. It became his first solo entry on Billboard Hot 100, peaking at number 82. The song was featured in a trailers for the 2016 movies The Edge of Seventeen and The Fundamentals of Caring. It was also in a TV spot for the Disney films Moana (2016),and the official trailer of The Croods: A New Age (2020).

Music video
The music video was released on August 18, 2016, and was filmed at Six Flags Over Texas.

Charts

Weekly charts

Year-end charts

References

2015 songs
2016 singles
Ben Rector songs
Songs written by David Hodges
Songs written by Ben Rector